The Nomna Bay Site is a prehistoric archaeological site on the east coast of the United States territory of Guam.  Located on the southeast coast in the community of Inarajan, the site's primary features are fourteen latte stone house sites, located within  of the waterline of Nomna Bay.  One of these house sites has a T-shaped layout, which is extremely unusual for Micronesia latte sites.  In the surrounding area are fire pits and stone mortar sites.  Radiocarbon dating places use of the site to between about 1360 and 1675.

The site was listed on the National Register of Historic Places in 1974.

See also
National Register of Historic Places listings in Guam

References

Archaeological sites on the National Register of Historic Places in Guam